Sooji toast is an Indian snack food or breakfast food that is made from bread and sooji.

Recipe 
Sooji is soaked in curd or buttermilk (preferably medium sour in taste) for 15 minutes. Salt can be added to taste. Other ingredients that can be added to enhance the flavour are tiny chopped pieces of green chilly, onion, ginger and a pinch of jeera. This mixture is applied on one side of a loaf of bread and toasted on a flat pan with a pinch of butter or ghee or cooking oil on a low flame. Once it turns golden brown, the second side is toasted.

The loaf can then be cut diagonally for easy serving and eating. It can be had as it is or with sauce or ketchup or chutney, depending on personal taste.

See also
 List of bread dishes
 List of toast dishes

Indian snack foods
Toast dishes